"Heart, We Did All That We Could" is a single by American country music artist Jean Shepard. Released in January 1967, it was the second single and title track from the album Heart, We Did All That We Could.  The song reached #12 on the Billboard Hot Country Singles chart.

It is performed by the character Teddi Barra at the Country Bear Jamboree attraction at some Disney parks.

Chart performance

References 

1967 singles
Jean Shepard songs
Song recordings produced by Ken Nelson (American record producer)
Songs written by Ned Miller
1967 songs
Capitol Records singles